Slater Branch is a stream in Madison County in the U.S. state of Missouri. It is a tributary of the Little Saint Francis River.

The identity of the namesake Slater is unknown.

See also
List of rivers of Missouri

References

Rivers of Madison County, Missouri
Rivers of Missouri